Stygioides aethiops is a species of moth of the family Cossidae. It is found in Uzbekistan.

References

Moths described in 1887
Cossinae